Juan de Pineda (Madrigal de las Altas Torres 1513 - Medina del Campo 1593) was a writer and a historian of the Spanish Golden Age.

After graduating from the University of Salamanca in 1540, he became a Franciscan.

Perhaps is most notable work is Monarchia Ecclesiastica (1576), which manages to cite almost every source and author known at the time.

1513 births
1593 deaths
Spanish Franciscans
Spanish Golden Age
16th-century Spanish historians
Spanish male writers
University of Salamanca alumni